Pleşeşti may refer to several places in Romania:

 Alexandru Vlahuţă, formerly called Pleşeşti, a commune in Vaslui County, Romania
 Pleşeşti, a village in Albac Commune, Alba County
 Pleşeşti, a village in Berca Commune, Buzău County
 Pleşeşti, a village in Podgoria Commune, Buzău County
 Pleşeşti, a village in Vultureşti Commune, Suceava County
 Pleşeşti, a village in Roșiile Commune, Vâlcea County
 Pleşeşti, a village in Boghești Commune, Vrancea County

See also 
 Pleșa (disambiguation)
 Pleși (disambiguation)
 Pleașa (disambiguation)
 Pleșoiu (disambiguation)